Warsaw is a city with powiat rights, and is further divided into 18 districts (dzielnica ), auxiliary units which are integral parts of the city as an entity, but with some limited powers devolved to their own local self-governments.

The current division into quarters was established in 2002. The 18 districts are informally divided broadly into the inner and outer city quarters, as follows: 
inner city districts
Śródmieście
Mokotów 
Ochota
Wola
Żoliborz
Praga Południe
Praga Północ
outer city (or "wreath") districts
Bemowo
Białołęka
Bielany
Rembertów
Targówek
Ursus
Ursynów
Wawer
Wesoła
Wilanów
Włochy

Districts of Warsaw

Neighbourhoods
Each of the districts is customarily subdivided into several smaller areas, known under the designation of a neighbourhood (osiedle), a unit with no legal or administrative powers, used for statistics or as a designation within the city localization system (Miejski System Informacji).

History

1994-2002

1990-1994

1959–1990

1951/1952–1959

Coats of arms
Some, but not all of the districts use specific coats of arms.

References

External links

Quarters of Warsaw